A pneumonic device is any equipment designed for use with or relating to the diaphragm. The iron lung and medical ventilator may be considered pneumonic devices. The term may also refer to any device used in the field of perspiratory therapy.

References 

Respiratory therapy